The Smith chart, invented by Phillip H. Smith (1905–1987) and independently by Mizuhashi Tosaku, is a graphical calculator or nomogram designed for electrical and electronics engineers specializing in radio frequency (RF) engineering to assist in solving problems with transmission lines and matching circuits. The Smith chart can be used to simultaneously display multiple parameters including impedances, admittances, reflection coefficients,  scattering parameters, noise figure circles, constant gain contours and regions for unconditional stability, including mechanical vibrations analysis. The Smith chart is most frequently used at or within the unity radius region. However, the remainder is still mathematically relevant, being used, for example, in oscillator design and stability analysis.
While the use of paper Smith charts for solving the complex mathematics involved in matching problems has been largely replaced by software based methods, the Smith chart is still a very useful method of showing how RF parameters behave at one or more frequencies, an alternative to using tabular information. 
Thus most RF circuit analysis software includes a Smith chart option for the display of results and all but the simplest impedance measuring instruments can plot measured results on a Smith chart display.

Overview

The Smith chart is a mathematical transformation of the two-dimensional Cartesian complex plane. Complex numbers with positive real parts map inside the circle. Those with negative real parts map outside the circle.
If we are dealing only with impedances with non-negative resistive components, our interest is focused on the area inside the circle.
The transformation, for an impedance Smith chart, is:

where  i.e., the complex impedance,  normalized by the reference impedance, . The impedance Smith chart is then an Argand plot of impedances thus transformed. Impedances with non-negative resistive components will appear inside a circle with unit radius; the origin will correspond to the reference impedance, .

The Smith chart is plotted on the complex reflection coefficient plane in two dimensions and may be scaled in normalised impedance (the most common), normalised admittance or both, using different colours to distinguish between them. These are often known as the Z, Y and YZ Smith charts respectively. Normalised scaling allows the Smith chart to be used for problems involving any characteristic or system impedance which is represented by the center point of the chart. The most commonly used normalization impedance is 50 ohms. Once an answer is obtained through the graphical constructions described below, it is straightforward to convert between normalised impedance (or normalised admittance) and the corresponding unnormalized value by multiplying by the characteristic impedance (admittance). Reflection coefficients can be read directly from the chart as they are unitless parameters.

The Smith chart has a scale around its circumference or periphery which is graduated in wavelengths and degrees. The wavelengths scale is used in distributed component problems and represents the distance measured along the transmission line connected between the generator or source and the load to the point under consideration. The degrees scale represents the angle of the voltage reflection coefficient at that point. The Smith chart may also be used for lumped-element matching and analysis problems.

Use of the Smith chart and the interpretation of the results obtained using it requires a good understanding of AC circuit theory and transmission-line theory, both of which are prerequisites for RF engineers.

As impedances and admittances change with frequency, problems using the Smith chart can only be solved manually using one frequency at a time, the result being represented by a point. This is often adequate for narrow band applications (typically up to about 5% to 10% bandwidth) but for wider bandwidths it is usually necessary to apply Smith chart techniques at more than one frequency across the operating frequency band. Provided the frequencies are sufficiently close, the resulting Smith chart points may be joined by straight lines to create a locus.

A locus of points on a Smith chart covering a range of frequencies can be used to visually represent:
how capacitive or how inductive a load is across the frequency range
how difficult matching is likely to be at various frequencies
how well matched a particular component is.
The accuracy of the Smith chart is reduced for problems involving a large locus of impedances or admittances, although the scaling can be magnified for individual areas to accommodate these.

Mathematical basis

Actual and normalised impedance and admittance
A transmission line with a characteristic impedance of  may be universally considered to have a characteristic admittance of  where

Any impedance,  expressed in ohms, may be normalised by dividing it by the characteristic impedance, so the normalised impedance using the lower case zT is given by 

Similarly, for normalised admittance

The SI unit of impedance is the ohm with the symbol of the upper case Greek letter omega (Ω) and the SI unit for admittance is the siemens with the symbol of an upper case letter S. Normalised impedance and normalised admittance are dimensionless. Actual impedances and admittances must be normalised before using them on a Smith chart. Once the result is obtained it may be de-normalised to obtain the actual result.

The normalised impedance Smith chart

Using transmission-line theory, if a transmission line is terminated in an impedance which differs from its characteristic impedance, a standing wave will be formed on the line comprising the resultant of both the incident or forward and the reflected or reversed waves. Using complex exponential notation:
 and

where

 is the temporal part of the wave
 is the spatial part of the wave and
 where
 is the angular frequency in radians per second (rad/s)
 is the frequency in hertz (Hz)
 is the time in seconds (s)
 is the distance measured along the transmission line from the load toward the generator in metres (m)
Also
 is the propagation constant which has SI units radians/meter
where
 is the attenuation constant in nepers per metre (Np/m)
 is the phase constant in radians per metre (rad/m)
The Smith chart is used with one frequency at a time, and only for one moment at a time, so the temporal part of the phase is fixed. All terms are actually multiplied by this to obtain the instantaneous phase, but it is conventional and understood to omit it. Therefore,
 and

The variation of complex reflection coefficient with position along the line

The complex voltage reflection coefficient  is defined as the ratio of the reflected wave to the incident (or forward) wave. Therefore,

where  is also a constant.

If the line is lossy ( is non-zero) this is represented on the Smith chart by a spiral path. In most Smith chart problems however, losses can be assumed negligible and the task of solving them is greatly simplified. For the loss free case therefore, the expression for complex reflection coefficient becomes 

The phase constant  may also be written as 

where  is the wavelength within the transmission line at the test frequency.

Therefore,

This equation shows that, for a standing wave, the complex reflection coefficient and impedance repeats every half wavelength along the transmission line. The complex reflection coefficient is generally simply referred to as reflection coefficient. The outer circumferential scale of the Smith chart represents the distance from the generator to the load scaled in wavelengths and is therefore scaled from zero to 0.50 .

The variation of normalised impedance with position along the line

and
.
By dividing these equations and substituting for both the voltage reflection coefficient

and the normalised impedance of the termination represented by the lower case , subscript T

gives the result:

Alternatively, in terms of the reflection coefficient

These are the equations which are used to construct the  Smith chart.

They both change with frequency so for any particular measurement, the frequency at which it was performed must be stated together with the characteristic impedance.

 may be expressed in magnitude and angle on a polar diagram. Any actual reflection coefficient must have a magnitude of less than or equal to unity so, at the test frequency, this may be expressed by a point inside a circle of unity radius. The Smith chart is actually constructed on such a polar diagram. The Smith chart scaling is designed in such a way that reflection coefficient can be converted to normalised impedance or vice versa. Using the Smith chart, the normalised impedance may be obtained with appreciable accuracy by plotting the point representing the reflection coefficient treating the Smith chart as a polar diagram and then reading its value directly using the characteristic Smith chart scaling. This technique is a graphical alternative to substituting the values in the equations.

By substituting the expression for how reflection coefficient changes along an unmatched loss-free transmission line

for the loss free case, into the equation for normalised impedance in terms of reflection coefficient
 
and using Euler's formula

yields the impedance-version transmission-line equation for the loss free case: 

where
 is the impedance 'seen' at the input of a loss free transmission line of length  terminated with an impedance 

Versions of the transmission-line equation may be similarly derived for the admittance loss free case and for the impedance and admittance lossy cases.

The Smith chart graphical equivalent of using the transmission-line equation is to normalise  to plot the resulting point on a  Smith chart and to draw a circle through that point centred at the Smith chart centre. The path along the arc of the circle represents how the impedance changes whilst moving along the transmission line. In this case the circumferential (wavelength) scaling must be used, remembering that this is the wavelength within the transmission line and may differ from the free space wavelength.

Regions of the  Smith chart
If a polar diagram is mapped on to a cartesian coordinate system it is conventional to measure angles relative to the positive -axis using a counterclockwise direction for positive angles. The magnitude of a complex number is the length of a straight line drawn from the origin to the point representing it.

If the termination is perfectly matched, the reflection coefficient will be zero, represented effectively by a circle of zero radius or in fact a point at the centre of the Smith chart. If the termination was a perfect open circuit or short circuit the magnitude of the reflection coefficient would be unity, all power would be reflected and the point would lie at some point on the unity circumference circle.

Circles of constant normalised resistance and constant normalised reactance
The normalised impedance Smith chart is composed of two families of circles: circles of constant normalised resistance and circles of constant normalised reactance. In the complex reflection coefficient plane the Smith chart occupies a circle of unity radius centred at the origin. In cartesian coordinates therefore the circle would pass through the points (+1,0) and (−1,0) on the -axis and the points (0,+1) and (0,−1) on the -axis.

with a, b, c and d real numbers.

Substituting these into the equation relating normalised impedance and complex reflection coefficient:

gives the following result:

This is the equation which describes how the complex reflection coefficient changes with the normalised impedance and may be used to construct both families of circles.

The  Smith chart
The  Smith chart is constructed in a similar way to the  Smith chart case but by expressing values of voltage reflection coefficient in terms of normalised admittance instead of normalised impedance. The normalised admittance  is the reciprocal of the normalised impedance , so

Therefore:

and

The  Smith chart appears like the normalised impedance, type but with the graphic nested circles rotated through 180°, but the numeric scale remaining in its same position (not rotated) as the  chart.

Similarly taking

for real  and  gives an analogous result, although with more and different minus signs:

The region above the -axis represents capacitive admittances and the region below the -axis represents inductive admittances. Capacitive admittances have positive imaginary parts and inductive admittances have negative imaginary parts.

Again, if the termination is perfectly matched the reflection coefficient will be zero, represented by a 'circle' of zero radius or in fact a point at the centre of the Smith chart. If the termination was a perfect open or short circuit the magnitude of the voltage reflection coefficient would be unity, all power would be reflected and the point would lie at some point on the unity circumference circle of the Smith chart.

Practical examples

To plot this, one may use the circumferential (reflection coefficient) angle scale to find the  graduation and a ruler to draw a line passing through this and the centre of the Smith chart. The length of the line would then be scaled to P1 assuming the Smith chart radius to be unity. For example, if the actual radius measured from the paper was 100 mm, the length OP1 would be 63 mm.

The following table gives some similar examples of points which are plotted on the Z Smith chart. For each, the reflection coefficient is given in polar form together with the corresponding normalised impedance in rectangular form. The conversion may be read directly from the Smith chart or by substitution into the equation.

Working with both the Z Smith chart and the Y Smith charts
In RF circuit and matching problems sometimes it is more convenient to work with admittances (representing conductances and susceptances) and sometimes it is more convenient to work with impedances (representing resistances and reactances). Solving a typical matching problem will often require several changes between both types of Smith chart, using normalised impedance for series elements and normalised admittances for parallel elements. For these a dual (normalised) impedance and admittance Smith chart may be used. Alternatively, one type may be used and the scaling converted to the other when required. In order to change from normalised impedance to normalised admittance or vice versa, the point representing the value of reflection coefficient under consideration is moved through exactly 180 degrees at the same radius. To graphically change this to the equivalent normalised admittance point, say Q1, a line is drawn with a ruler from P1 through the Smith chart centre to Q1, an equal radius in the opposite direction. This is equivalent to moving the point through a circular path of exactly 180 degrees. Reading the value from the Smith chart for Q1, remembering that the scaling is now in normalised admittance,  gives . Performing the calculation

manually will confirm this.

Once a transformation from impedance to admittance has been performed, the scaling changes to normalised admittance until a later transformation back to normalised impedance is performed.

The table below shows examples of normalised impedances and their equivalent normalised admittances obtained by rotation of the point through 180°. Again, these may be obtained either by calculation or using a Smith chart as shown, converting between the normalised impedance and normalised admittances planes.

Choice of Smith chart type and component type
The choice of whether to use the Z Smith chart or the Y Smith chart for any particular calculation depends on which is more convenient. Impedances in series and admittances in parallel add while impedances in parallel and admittances in series are related by a reciprocal equation.

For admittances the reverse is true, that is

Dealing with the reciprocals, especially in complex numbers, is more time consuming and error-prone than using linear addition. In general therefore, most RF engineers work in the plane where the circuit topography supports linear addition. The following table gives the complex expressions for impedance (real and normalised) and admittance (real and normalised) for each of the three basic passive circuit elements: resistance, inductance and capacitance. Using just the characteristic impedance (or characteristic admittance) and test frequency an equivalent circuit can be found and vice versa.

Using the Smith chart to solve conjugate matching problems with distributed components
Distributed matching becomes feasible and is sometimes required when the physical size of the matching components is more than about 5% of a wavelength at the operating frequency. Here the electrical behaviour of many lumped components becomes rather unpredictable. This occurs in microwave circuits and when high power requires large components in shortwave, FM and TV Broadcasting,

For distributed components the effects on reflection coefficient and impedance of moving along the transmission line must be allowed for using the outer circumferential scale of the Smith chart which is calibrated in wavelengths.

The following example shows how a transmission line, terminated with an arbitrary load, may be matched at one frequency either with a series or parallel reactive component in each case connected at precise positions.

Supposing a loss-free air-spaced transmission line of characteristic impedance , operating at a frequency of 800 MHz, is terminated with a circuit comprising a 17.5  resistor in series with a 6.5 nanohenry (6.5 nH) inductor. How may the line be matched?

From the table above, the reactance of the inductor forming part of the termination at 800 MHz is

so the impedance of the combination is given by

and the normalised impedance is

This is plotted on the Z Smith chart at point P20. The line OP20 is extended through to the wavelength scale where it intersects at the point . As the transmission line is loss free, a circle centred at the centre of the Smith chart is drawn through the point P20 to represent the path of the constant magnitude reflection coefficient due to the termination. At point P21 the circle intersects with the unity circle of constant normalised resistance at 
.

Since the transmission line is air-spaced, the wavelength at 800 MHz in the line is the same as that in free space and is given by

The result gives , making the position of the matching component 29.6 mm from the load.

The conjugate match for the impedance at P21 is 

As the Smith chart is still in the normalised impedance plane, from the table above a series capacitor  is required where

Rearranging, we obtain
.
Substitution of known values gives

To match the termination at 800 MHz, a series capacitor of 2.6 pF must be placed in series with the transmission line at a distance of 29.6 mm from the termination.

An alternative shunt match could be calculated after performing a Smith chart transformation from normalised impedance to normalised admittance. Point Q20 is the equivalent of P20 but expressed as a normalised admittance. Reading from the Smith chart scaling, remembering that this is now a normalised admittance gives

(In fact this value is not actually used). However, the extension of the line OQ20 through to the wavelength scale gives . The earliest point at which a shunt conjugate match could be introduced, moving towards the generator, would be at Q21, the same position as the previous P21, but this time representing a normalised admittance given by 
.
The distance along the transmission line is in this case 

which converts to 123 mm.

The conjugate matching component is required to have a normalised admittance of
.
From the table it can be seen that a negative admittance would require an inductor, connected in parallel with the transmission line.

This gives the result 

A suitable inductive shunt matching would therefore be a 6.5 nH inductor in parallel with the line positioned at 123 mm from the load.

3D Smith chart

A generalization of the Smith chart to a three dimensional sphere, based on the extended complex plane (Riemann sphere) and inversive geometry, was proposed by Muller, et al in 2011.

The chart unifies the passive and active circuit design on little and big circles on the surface of a unit sphere, using a stereographic conformal map of the reflection coefficient's generalized plane. Considering the point at infinity, the space of the new chart includes all possible loads: The north pole is the perfectly matched point, while the south pole is the completely mismatched point.

The 3D Smith chart has been further extended outside of the spherical surface, for plotting various scalar parameters, such as group delay, quality factors, or frequency orientation. The visual frequency orientation (clockwise vs. counter-clockwise) enables one to differentiate between a negative / capacitance and positive / inductive whose reflection coefficients are the same when plotted on a 2D Smith chart, but whose orientations diverge as frequency increases.

References

Further reading
 For an early representation of this graphical depiction before they were called 'Smith Charts', see , In particular, Fig. 13 on p. 810.

External links

 
  
 
  Non-commercial, interactive Smith Chart that looks best in Excel 2007+.
  Non-commercial, available for Windows, Mac, and Linux. Many Smith chart tutorial videos. No circuit size restrictions. Not limited to ladder circuits.  
  Commercial and free Smith chart for Windows
  Free web based Smith Chart Educational tool available on GitHub.
  2D and 3D Smith chart generalized tool for active and passive circuits (free for academia/education).

Electrical engineering
Charts